U-95 may refer to one of the following German submarines:

 , a Type U 93 submarine launched in 1917 and that served in the First World War until sunk on 16 January 1918
 During the First World War, Germany also had these submarines with similar names:
 , a Type UB III submarine launched in 1918 and surrendered on 21 November 1918; broken up at La Spezia in May 1919
 , a Type UC III submarine launched in 1918 and surrendered on 22 November 1918; broken up at Fareham in 1921
 , a Type VIIC submarine that served in the Second World War until sunk on 28 November 1941

Submarines of Germany